Farz Ki Jung is a 1989 Indian Bollywood action film directed by R.P. Swamy and produced by Dalwinder Sohal. It stars Govinda, Shashi Kapoor, Amrish Puri and Neelam in pivotal roles.

Plot
Honest, hardworking, and diligent Police Inspector Vikram, gets his just reward by being arrested for possession of drugs. His mother gets a shock, and passes away instantly. Vikram is then tried in court, convicted, and sentenced to prison for several years. While he prison he acquires knowledge and skills to become a career criminal, as he now realizes that honesty does not pay, not realizing that this is going to pit him against his very own brother, Inspector Amar, who has also inherited Vikram's honesty and diligence.

Cast

 Shashi Kapoor as Inspector Vikram
 Govinda as Vishal
 Neelam as Kavita
 Dalwinder Sohal as Inspector Amar
 Raza Murad as Inspector Gill
 Amrish Puri as Jai Kishan "J. K."
 Gita Siddharth as Laxmi (Jai Kishan's Wife)
 Iftekhar as Police Commissioner Walia
 Anjana Mumtaz as Jyoti (Vikram's Wife)
 Ashalata Wabgaonkar as Vikram's Mother
 Padma Khanna as Mrs. Suvarna Gill
 Yunus Parvez as Mr. Pandey, Vegetable vendor
 Mac Mohan as Janga
 Bob Christo as Mr. Barker
 Satyen Kappu as Ramdin
 Pinchoo Kapoor as CBI Officer Kulkarni
 Bhagwan as Police Constable Pandu
 Birbal as Man who gives complaint to  Police Constable Pandu

Music

References

External links

1980s Hindi-language films
1989 films
Films scored by Bappi Lahiri
Indian action drama films